In Tibetan cuisine, chetang goiche are strips of dough, fried with rapeseed oil and brown sugar.

See also
 List of Tibetan dishes

References

Tibetan cuisine